Ame Son was a progressive rock band from France. They are notable for being featured on the Nurse With Wound list. Members of Ame Son also were in the band Red Noise and Komintern.

Discography
Catalyse (1971)
Primitive Expression (1976)

French progressive rock groups
BYG Actuel artists